The Nikon D5 is a full frame professional DSLR camera announced by Nikon Corporation on 6 January 2016 to succeed the D4S as its flagship DSLR. The D5 offers a number of improvements over its predecessor including a new image sensor, new image processor, improved ergonomics and expanded ISO range. Additionally, improved auto focus (AF) mode were introduced. On 23 February 2017, at CP+ show, a special edition was released for Nikon's 100th anniversary.

It was succeeded by the Nikon D6, announced on February 12, 2020.

Features

While the D5 retains many features of the Nikon D4S, it offers the following new features and improvements:
 Redesigned 20.8-megapixel image sensor with less noise
 Nikon EXPEED5 image processor
 Expanded ISO range of ISO 100–102,400 (boosted range of ISO 50–3,280,000)
 4K video (3840 x 2160) 30p video capture with uncompressed video output via HDMI
 Improved autofocus and subject tracking algorithms
 Increasing continuous shooting speed to 12fps with full AF
 Touchscreen Rear LCD monitor

In June 2016, a firmware update added several significant improvements:
 The maximum video recording time was increased to 29:59 for all resolutions, including 4K.
 Electronic vibration reduction was added for video shooting.
 A new 9-point dynamic autofocus mode was added for stills shooting.
 Also added for stills shooting was a flicker reduction mode, in which the moment of exposure is adjusted to compensate for flickering electric lighting.

Uses

NASA has used these forms of cameras on the International Space Station for internal and Earth photography.

See also
Nikon
Nikon D4s
Nikon D6

References

External links

 Nikon D5, Nikon USA
 Nikon D5 User Manuals, Guides and Software Nikon Download-center

D5
D5
Live-preview digital cameras
Cameras introduced in 2016
Full-frame DSLR cameras